Reference Re Companies' Creditors Arrangement Act is a decision of the Supreme Court of Canada on the constitutionality of the Companies' Creditors Arrangement Act as part of the bankruptcy and insolvency jurisdiction of the Parliament of Canada.

Background

At the onset of the Great Depression, the Parliament of Canada passed the Companies' Creditors Arrangement Act, 1933 ("CCAA") in order to provide an alternative procedure other than liquidation that could be used by insolvent companies. Charles Cahan, Secretary of State of Canada, said at the bill's first reading, it was necessary “because of the prevailing commercial and industrial depression.”

The provinces of Quebec and Ontario disputed the constitutionality of the Act, as they believed it intruded into provincial jurisdiction with respect to property and civil rights. Accordingly, the federal government posed the following reference question to the Supreme Court of Canada:

At the Supreme Court of Canada

The Court unanimously ruled that the Act was intra vires the Parliament of Canada, as it dealt with matters falling within "bankruptcy and insolvency" under s. 91(21) of the British North America Act, 1867.

Majority ruling by Duff CJ

Legislation in respect of compositions and arrangements is a natural and ordinary component of a system of bankruptcy and insolvency law, and provisions similar to the CCAA had already been passed before and after Confederation. However, the provisions of the Bankruptcy Act, 1919 apply only when an assignment or receiving order has been issued, and the Winding-Up Act applies only in the case of a company which is in course of being wound up. The CCAA, on the other hand, creates powers which can be exercised in case, and only in case, of insolvency.

Therefore, the Act enables arrangements to be made with respect to an insolvent company, under judicial authority which, otherwise, might not be valid prior to the initiation of proceedings in bankruptcy. As Lord Cave stated in Royal Bank of Canada v. Larue, “the exclusive legislative authority to deal with all matters within the domain of bankruptcy and insolvency is vested in Parliament.”

Concurring ruling by Cannon J

Before and since Confederation, arrangements with the creditors have always been of the very essence of any system of bankruptcy or insolvency legislation. Under current Canadian law and under the British Bankruptcy Act 1914, where a person is subject to bankruptcy proceedings, and if no composition or scheme of arrangement is approved, he will be declared bankrupt, and his property becomes divisible among his creditors and vests in a trustee.

While CCAA proceedings are not bankruptcy proceedings, they are insolvency proceedings. As such, they are intended to prevent a declaration of bankruptcy, where it would be in the best interest of the creditors. Such an intent has been expressed in Canadian law since the pre-Confederation Insolvent Act of 1864. Cushing v. Dupuy and Royal Bank of Canada v Larue were stated as authority under which Parliament could pass the Act.

Impact
Many Canadian legal commentators at the time expected that the CCAA, together with 1934's Farmers' Creditors Arrangement Act, would be declared unconstitutional as encroaching upon the provincial power over property and civil rights in relation to the rights of secured creditors, and they were astonished when both were upheld. The Parliament of Canada would not further extend its reach over secured creditors until 1992's amendments to the Bankruptcy and Insolvency Act.

After being employed in the 1930s, the CCAA did not see significant usage again until the 1980s. The Supreme Court of Canada did not hear any appeals relating to the CCAA until Century Services Inc. v. Canada (Attorney General) in 2010.

Further reading

Notes

References

Canadian insolvency case law
Supreme Court of Canada cases
1934 in Canadian case law
Supreme Court of Canada reference question cases